"Everything's Alright" is a song from the 1970 album and 1971 rock opera Jesus Christ Superstar by Tim Rice and Andrew Lloyd Webber. It is about the anointing of Jesus.

In the song, Mary Magdalene tries to calm Jesus with an expensive ointment and tells him not to get worried. Judas accuses her of wasting resources which would be better served helping the poor. Jesus retorts by saying that there will always be poverty in the world and that they will never be able to help everyone.

The song is musically notable for its  time signature.

Single release

Yvonne Elliman, who sang the part of Mary Magdalene on the original rock opera concept album Jesus Christ Superstar and also in the 1971 Broadway original cast and 1973 film, released a single of "Everything's Alright" in 1971, which reached #92 on the Billboard Hot 100.

Cash Box said of it that "Yvonne once again reaches into the wealth of material from the Rice-Webber classic and comes up with a winner every bit as strong as her first 'I Don't Know How To Love Him' disk.

Everything's Alright (Reprise)
The reprise of "Everything's Alright" is sung by Mary Magdalene to calm Jesus after his intense day of negative events, as he goes to sleep. The short, 29 second reprise leads into the hit single, "I Don't Know How to Love Him," which is also sung by Mary Magdalene. In the 1973 film version, only the "Close your Eyes" number is sung, omitting the rest of the lyrics, including the line: "I know that I will sleep well tonight", sung by Jesus.

John Farnham, Kate Ceberano & Jon Stevens version

John Farnham, Kate Ceberano, and Jon Stevens released a version of "Everything's Alright" in 1992. The song peaked at number 6 for one week in the Australian Recording Industry Association's ARIA Charts. The song stayed in the ARIA Charts top 10 for five weeks. It spent an overall total of 14 weeks in Australia's ARIA Charts: entry date: 26 July 1992 at number 46, exit date: 25 October 1992 at number 44.

Track listing
Everything's Alright (4.55) 
Overture (3.51) (by Andrew Lloyd Webber & Tim Rice)

Charts

Weekly charts

End of year charts

Sales and certifications

References

1970 songs
1971 singles
Decca Records singles
John Farnham songs
Jon Stevens songs
Kate Ceberano songs
MCA Records singles
PolyGram singles
Sarah Brightman songs
Songs about Jesus
Songs from Jesus Christ Superstar
Songs with lyrics by Tim Rice
Songs with music by Andrew Lloyd Webber